Darling Run is a stream in Coshocton County, in the U.S. state of Ohio.

Darling Run was named for Robert Darling, who operated a mill there.

See also
List of rivers of Ohio

References

Rivers of Coshocton County, Ohio
Rivers of Ohio